Leopold is a surname. Notable people with the surname include:

 A. Fredric Leopold (1919–2008), American lawyer and politician 
 Aldo Leopold (1887–1948), American author and scientist
 Chris Leopold (born 1968), Louisiana politician
 Ernst Leopold Prinz von Sachsen-Coburg und Gotha (1935–1996)
 Hendricus Leopold (1918–2008), Dutch diplomat
 J. H. Leopold (1865–1925), Dutch poet and classicist
 Johann Leopold, Hereditary Prince of Saxe-Coburg and Gotha (1906–1972)
 Josef Leopold (1889–1941), Austrian Nazi politician
 Juliane Leopold (born 1983), German journalist 
 Luna Leopold (1915–2006), American geomorphologist and hydrologist
 Matthew Leopold, American attorney
 Nathan Leopold (1904–1971), American convicted of the 1924 kidnap and murder of Bobby Franks
 Wanda Leopold (1920–1977), Polish translator and social science activist

See also
 Leopold (given name)
 Leopold (disambiguation)

Surnames of English origin
Surnames of Dutch origin
Surnames of German origin